Roger A. Hart (born c. 1950) is a child-rights academic, currently serving as Professor of Psychology and Geography at the City University of New York and as co-director of the Children's Environments Research Group.

Education
Hart received a B.A. in geography from the University of Hull in England in 1968 and undertook a Masters and PhD in geography at Clark University in Worcester, Massachusetts.

Research
Hart's research has focused on understanding the everyday lives of children and youth and, to this end, he has designed many participatory methodologies for working with young people.  He has collaborated with others in the application of theory and research to the planning and design of children's environments and to environmental education.

In recent years, his work has been more broadly concerned with finding ways to foster the participation of disadvantaged children in fulfilling their rights.  To this end, he has collaborated in numerous countries with international non-governmental agencies.  With UNICEF, he has written 2 books on children's participation and co-authored “Cities for Children: Children’s Rights, Poverty and Urban Management”.  With the Save the Children Alliance, he has written “The Children’s Clubs of Nepal: A Democratic Experiment” and the video “Mirrors of Ourselves: Tools of Democratic Self Reflection for Groups of Children and Youth”.

See also 
 Youth participation
 Children's rights
 UNICEF

Bibliography
Undesigning For Children: Creating Space for Free Play and Informal Learning in Community Gardens (with Selim Iltus and Peter Beeton). New York: Design Trust For Public Spaces, in press.
Cities for Children: Children’s Rights, Poverty and Urban Management (with Bartlett, S., de la Barra, X., Missair, A., and Satterthwaite, D.).  New York: UNICEF, and London: Earthscan, Summer, 1999.
Children’s Participation: The Theory And Practice Of Involving Young Citizens In Community Development and Environmental Care. New York: UNICEF, and London: Earthscan, 1997 (Also available in Chinese, Japanese and Spanish).
Environments for Children: Understanding and Acting on the Environmental Hazards That Threaten Infants, Children and Their Parents.  (with Satterthwaite, D., Levy C., Ross D., and Stevens, C.).  New York: UNICEF, and London: Earthscan, 1997.
Children's Participation: from Tokenism to Citizenship.  for UNICEF Innocenti Essays, No. 4, UNICEF/International Child Development Centre, Florence, Italy, 1992. Published by the Latin American office of UNICEF as La Participacion de los Niños: de la participacion simbolica a la Participacion Autentica.  (Also published by NGOs in French, Turkish, Japanese and Thai).
Getting in Touch with Play: Creating Play Environments for Children with Visual Impairments. (with Kim Blakely and Maryanne Lang).  New York: Lighthouse National Center for Vision and Child Development, 1991.
Land and Life: A World Geography.  (with Harm de Blij and Gerald Danzer).  Chicago, IL:  Scott-Foresman Publishing Company, 1988.
Children's Experience of Place: A Developmental Study.  New York.: Irvington Publishers (distributed by Halstead/Wiley Press), 1978.  (reviews in Science, Geographical Review, and Contemporary Psychology).

References

External links
Interview with Roger Hart
Children's Environments Research Group

21st-century American psychologists
Environmental psychologists
Clark University alumni
UNICEF people
Living people
Year of birth missing (living people)